The 2020 United States presidential election in New Jersey was held on Tuesday, November 3, 2020, as part of the 2020 United States presidential election in which all 50 states plus the District of Columbia participated. New Jersey voters chose electors to represent them in the Electoral College via a popular vote, pitting the Republican Party's nominee, incumbent President Donald Trump, and running mate Vice President Mike Pence against Democratic Party nominee, former Vice President Joe Biden, and his running mate California Senator Kamala Harris. New Jersey has 14 electoral votes in the Electoral College.

Biden carried New Jersey by 15.93%, making the state 11.48% more Democratic than the nation as a whole. Per exit polls by the Associated Press, Biden's victory came from a coalition of key Democratic constituencies, including 86% of Blacks, 76% of Asians, 72% of Hispanic and Latino Americans, and 50% of Whites. Biden's strength with Asian Americans was evident in New Jersey, where Asians constituted 10.0% of the population in 2019.

Biden flipped Gloucester County, which was reliably Democratic until Trump flipped it in 2016. He also became the first Democrat since Lyndon B. Johnson in 1964 to win Morris County, which Cory Booker won in the simultaneous senate election. This also became the first presidential election since 2000 in which Salem County did not vote for the national winner. Biden subsequently became the first Democrat since 1992 to win the White House without carrying Salem County. Trump carried 255 of New Jersey's 565 municipalities, fewer than the 307 he carried in 2016, with Biden carrying the other 310. Biden's 2.6 million votes is the most received by any candidate of either party in a presidential election in the state's history.

Primary elections
The primary elections were originally scheduled for June 2, 2020. In April, they were moved to July 7 due to concerns over the COVID-19 pandemic. On May 15, 2020, Governor Phil Murphy signed an executive order declaring the primary election to become a primarily vote-by-mail election. Democratic and Republican voters will automatically receive a vote-by-mail ballot while unaffiliated and inactive voters will get a vote-by-mail application. Unaffiliated voters must declare their party in the application and send in to their respective county board of elections in order to vote and receive their primary election ballot. A limited number of polling stations in each county will be available on primary day for those who prefer to vote in person (including with provisional ballots if they're unable to obtain one) and for voters with disabilities.

Republican primary
Incumbent President Donald Trump ran unopposed in the Republican primary. The state has 49 delegates to the 2020 Republican National Convention.

Democratic primary

Green primary

General election

Predictions

Polling

Graphical summary

Aggregate polls

Polls

Donald Trump vs. Bernie Sanders

Donald Trump vs. Elizabeth Warren

Donald Trump vs. Michael Bloomberg

Donald Trump vs. Pete Buttigieg

Donald Trump vs. Amy Klobuchar

Results

Results by county
Show/hide: [vote percentages]

Counties that flipped from Republican to Democratic

Gloucester (largest municipality: Washington Township)
Morris (largest municipality: Parsippany)

By congressional district
Biden won 9 out of the 12 congressional districts in New Jersey. Trump won 3, including one that elected a Democrat.

Analysis
As the polls predicted, Joe Biden won New Jersey by a wide margin. Biden ran up huge margins in the state's major cities such as Newark, Jersey City, Paterson, Trenton, Atlantic City, Camden, and several others. In addition to carrying all the counties that Clinton won in 2016, Biden flipped Gloucester County, which was a reliably blue county before Trump won it in 2016. Biden also won Morris County, which had never voted Democratic in any presidential race since 1964; Senator Cory Booker concurrently won Morris County in his reelection victory as well. In neighboring Hunterdon County, Biden came within 4.4 points of victory despite the county being a reliably Republican stronghold as well. Biden recorded the highest share of the vote in Sussex and Hunterdon Counties for a Democrat since 1964, the last time either county voted Democratic. 

Trump, meanwhile, performed strongly in Ocean County, which is reliably red. He also did well in Sussex and Warren counties, two northern rural counties that have not voted Democratic since 1964. Salem County, which Trump flipped in 2016, remained in his column and he also narrowly held on to Monmouth County, which hasn't voted Democratic since 2000 but where the margins have always been somewhat close. He also improved in the urban counties of Essex and Hudson, due to noticeable improvements in several of those counties' most populated cities, such as Jersey City and Newark.

Ultimately, Trump carried 255 of New Jersey's 565 municipalities, less than the 307 he carried in 2016, with Biden carrying the other 310. Compared to their 2016 margins, 471 of New Jersey's 565 municipalities swung towards Biden in this election. However, Trump was able to improve significantly upon his 2016 margins in many of New Jersey's most heavily populated cities, which kept the statewide margin within 2% of the 2016 results. For example, in New Jersey's most populated city, Newark, Trump nearly doubled his 2016 share of the vote, going from 6.63% to 12.25% of the vote. This was the best Republican performance in Newark since George W. Bush received 12.8% of the vote in 2004. Other populated cities, such as Paterson and Camden, posted similarly notable shifts towards the GOP, with much of the rest of the state shifting towards the Democrats instead.

See also
 United States presidential elections in New Jersey
 2020 New Jersey elections
 Bilingual elections requirement for New Jersey (per Voting Rights Act Amendments of 2006)
 2020 United States presidential election
 2020 Democratic Party presidential primaries
 2020 Republican Party presidential primaries
 2020 United States elections

Notes

References

Further reading

External links
 
 
  (State affiliate of the U.S. League of Women Voters)
 

New Jersey
2020
Presidential